Nick Perry may refer to:

Nick Perry (1916–2003), mastermind of the 1980 Pennsylvania Lottery scandal
N. Nick Perry (born 1950), American politician
Nick Perry (linebacker) (born 1990), American football player
Nick Perry (safety) (born 1991), American football player and coach 
Nick Perry (British Army officer), British general
Nick Perry (journalist), American and New Zealand journalist
Nick Perry (writer), British playwright and screenwriter